Melody Key is a privately owned island in the Florida Keys in Monroe County, Florida, United States. It is 5.5 acres-wide. , it was the world's fifth most expensive island. As of January 2017, the island was listed for sale, at an asking price of $7 million. After being listed Melody Key suffered severe storm damage and later sold for $3.2 million via HGTV's Islands Hunters television show.

References

Islands of Monroe County, Florida
Islands of the Florida Keys
Islands of Florida
Private islands of Florida